James Michael Ignatius Mathison (November 11, 1878 – July 4, 1911) was an American professional baseball player who played in twenty-nine games for the Baltimore Orioles during the  season.
He was born in Baltimore, Maryland and died there at the age of 32.

External links

1878 births
1911 deaths
Baltimore Orioles (1901–02) players
Major League Baseball third basemen
Baseball players from Baltimore
Meriden Silverites players
Little Rock Travelers players
Memphis Egyptians players
Jacksonville Jays players